Gayson is both a surname and a given name. Notable people with the name include:

 Eunice Gayson (1931–2018), British actress
 Gayson Gregory (born 1982), Antiguan footballer

See also
 Grayson (surname)
 Mayson
 Rayson